Teala Dunn (born December 8, 1996) is an American actress and singer. She had a role in the TBS sitcom Are We There Yet? as Lindsey Kingston-Persons, taking Aleisha Allen's place.

Career
Dunn is known for her role as a YouTube vlogger and was previously the best friend of fellow YouTuber Sierra Furtado, and she is also known for her recurring role as Juanita on the Nickelodeon television show, The Naked Brothers Band, Kelsey on The Thundermans, and as the voice of Turtle Tuck on Wonder Pets!.

Dunn made a guest appearance in Law & Order: Special Victims Unit. On the big screen, she was seen opposite Elle Fanning and Patricia Clarkson in Phoebe in Wonderland, which premiered at the Sundance Film Festival in 2008. Dunn also appeared with Felicity Huffman in Transamerica, and was also heard as a bunny in Disney's Enchanted.

Dunn appeared on Shake It Up as Dina's childhood nemesis, and also appeared on Enlisted as Command Sergeant Major Donald Cody's teenage daughter.

Filmography

Film

Television

References

External links

 
 

1996 births
African-American actresses
American child actresses
American film actresses
Place of birth missing (living people)
American television actresses
American voice actresses
Living people
American YouTubers
21st-century African-American people
21st-century African-American women